Mary Annie Sloane (10 December 1867 – 30 November 1961) was an English artist associated with the Arts and Crafts movement.

Life
She was born in Leicester, an area which was the subject of many of her prints. She studied at Leicester School of Art and was taught etching and engraving by Hubert von Herkomer in his school at Bushey, and later studied under Francis Job Short at the Royal College of Art. She lived for many years in the village of Enderby, Leicestershire, where she made a number of etchings of weavers, a traditional craft practised there as well as other subjects.

She became a close friend of May Morris, William Morris's daughter, and lived with her for a while in Majorca. She later took over the lease of May’s house at 8 Hammersmith Terrace in London, near Kelmscott House. She was a member and Honorary Secretary of the Women’s Guild of Arts that May Morris founded in 1907. She was a frequent visitor to William Morris's houses, where she met other members of the Arts and Crafts movement.

She exhibited at the Royal Academy and the Paris Salon, but few of her works were published. In 2012-3 there was an exhibition of her watercolours and engravings at the William Morris Society in Hammersmith. In 2016 she was the subject of an exhibition at Leicester's New Walk Museum.

Works
 Etching and drypoint at the Victoria and Albert Museum 
 Stockinger weaving silk stockings, an etching of the local craft at Enderby 
 View from the nook, Enderby 
 Portrait of a young lady, oil painting 
 A framework knitter at work, watercolour

References

Arts and Crafts movement artists
English printmakers
19th-century English painters
20th-century English painters
Alumni of the Royal College of Art
1867 births
1961 deaths
20th-century British printmakers
People from Leicester
People from Enderby, Leicestershire